Randol or Randoll may refer to:

People

Given name 
 Randoll Coate (1909–2005), British diplomat and maze designer
 Randol Fawkes (1924–2000), Bahamian politician
 E. Randol Schoenberg (born 1966), American lawyer

Surname 
 Alanson Merwin Randol (1837–1887), American Civil War officer
 George Randol (1895–1973), American film actor and director

Places 
 Randol Township, Cape Girardeau County, Missouri, USA
 Randol Abbey, a Benedicting monastery near Saint-Saturnin, France